Brinson is a town in Decatur County, Georgia, United States. As of the 2020 census, the city had a population of 217.

History
Variant names were "Mount Zion and "Spring Creek. Simeon Brinson, an early postmaster and first mayor, gave the town its present name. The Georgia General Assembly incorporated  the place as the "Town of Brinson" in 1907.

Agriculture predominates in the area.  According to one compilation, three of the top ten recipients of U.S. farm subsidies are in Brinson.

Geography
Brinson is located in northwestern Decatur County at  (30.979029, -84.736059). U.S. Route 84 passes through the southwest side of the town, leading southeast  to Bainbridge, the Decatur County seat, and northwest 44 miles to Dothan, Alabama.

Demographics

At the 2000 census, there were 225 people, 90 households and 63 families residing in the town. The racial makeup of the town was 72.89% White, 23.56% African American, 0.89% Native American, 1.33% from other races, and 1.33% from two or more races. Hispanic or Latino of any race were 3.56% of the population.

There were 90 households, of which 33.3% had children under the age of 18 living with them, 54.4% were married couples living together, 11.1% had a female householder with no husband present, and 28.9% were non-families. 26.7% of all households were made up of individuals, and 15.6% had someone living alone who was 65 years of age or older. The average household size was 2.50 and the average family size was 3.08.

Age distribution was 24.9% under the age of 18, 5.8% from 18 to 24, 28.9% from 25 to 44, 24.4% from 45 to 64, and 16.0% who were 65 years of age or older. The median age was 40 years. For every 100 females, there were 97.4 males. For every 100 females age 18 and over, there were 89.9 males.

The median household income was $27,321, and the median family income was $31,250. Males had a median income of $21,458 versus $13,750 for females. The per capita income for the town was $12,613. About 11.5% of families and 13.9% of the population were below the poverty line, including 11.1% of those under the age of eighteen and 10.0% of those 65 or over.

References

External links
 Brinson historical marker

Towns in Decatur County, Georgia
Towns in Georgia (U.S. state)